Susanna Cappellaro (Cohen) is an Italian actress and writer living in Soho, London.

Biography 
Cappellaro started her career in the fashion world. In 2011 she began her film career.  Her first role was in Berberian Sound Studio (directed by Peter Strickland and produced by Warp).  Her next role was playing a journalist alongside Filippo Timi in the Italian film Notte Finisce con Gallo.

Cappellaro's most profile role to date was playing Naomi Collins in Tim Burton's Dark Shadows. This character is the young mother of the lead role, Barnabas Collins, played by Johnny Depp.

In 2014 Cappellaro produced and acted in Checkmate, a short movie set in the magical Welsh landscape. Directed by Jason Bradbury, it also stars Ornella Muti and Sian Phillips and Lachlan Nieober.

2015 sees her in her first leading role in Papagajka, a psychological thriller set in Sarajevo. Directed by Emma Rozanski and under the mentorship of Béla Tarr.

She started her career as a stylist at Flair Magazine in Milan and then moved on to MTV Italy. From there she became a writer, with articles published in XL-La Repubblica, Rodeo Magazine, Flair and Vogue.

References

External links 

Italian actresses
Italian women writers
Living people
Year of birth missing (living people)